The four-spot megrim (Lepidorhombus boscii) is a species of flatfish in the family Scophthalmidae. It can be separated from its close relative, the megrim or whiff (L. whiffiagonis), by the dark spots towards the rear of the fins.

In Spanish it is known as  gallo de cuatro manchas, (or more often, simply gallo) sometimes (depending on the region or city) ojito, or rapante. In Catalan it is palaia  bruixa de quatre taques, serrandell or  llisèria. In France it is known as  cardine à quatre taches.

References

Scophthalmidae
Fish described in 1810
Taxa named by Antoine Risso